Vadstena is a locality and the seat of Vadstena Municipality, Östergötland County, Sweden, with 5,613 inhabitants in 2010. From 1974 to 1979 Vadstena was administered as part of Motala Municipality.

Despite its small population, Vadstena is, for historical reasons, still referred to as a city: though it received its city privileges in 1400), Statistics Sweden only counts  as cities Swedish urban localities with more than 10,000 inhabitants.

History
Above all, the city of Vadstena is noted for two important facts of Swedish history. It was in Vadstena, year 1350, that Saint Bridget of Sweden founded the first monastery of her Bridgettine Order, and Vadstena Castle is one of Sweden’s best-preserved castles from the era of Gustav Vasa in the 16th century, when Sweden became Protestant. Today the surviving buildings of the monastery are occupied by a hotel, (Vadstena Klosterhotel), and the castle houses the provincial archives and a museum of 16th and 17th century furniture, portraits and paintings.

Since the 16th century, Vadstena has been the location of a hospital. Earlier in history, it mainly housed mental patients. Today, some of the oldest buildings present the Vadstena Hospital Museum.

The buildings in the city centre date mainly from the 16th, 17th and 18th centuries. The old town is well preserved and the streets have not changed much over the centuries. The Town Hall is Sweden's oldest, dating back to the early 15th century. Notable is the main street (Storgatan) where all the shops are gathered, as they would have been during the Middle Ages.

The botanist Erik Acharius died in Vadstena (1819).

Railway
Vadstena also preserves elements of more recent history in the museum of the Vadstena-Fågelsta narrow gauge railway (Wadstena Fogelsta Järnväg). This 891 mm (or Swedish three foot) railway was once part of a large network of narrow-gauge railways in Östergötland constructed in the latter part of the 19th century.

Famous People
Joakim Lundell is a famous Swedish singer and youtuber.

Gallery

References

Weblinks 
 Tourism website of Vadstena  (swedish, german, english)

Populated lakeshore places in Sweden
Populated places in Vadstena Municipality
Municipal seats of Östergötland County
Swedish municipal seats
891 mm gauge railways in Sweden